The 2016 Orlando City SC season was the club's sixth season of existence in Orlando, and second season in Major League Soccer, the top-flight league in the United States soccer league system.

Background 

On July 15, 2015, Orlando City opened an additional 4,000 seats for sale to potential season ticket holders, bringing the total available season tickets to 18,000. The extra allotment sold out on August 18, 2015. Season tickets are again sold out for the 2016 season.

On October 15, 2015, Orlando City announced that they would field an owned-and-operated team in the United Soccer League, Orlando City B. The team began play in the 2016 season at Eastern Florida State College's Melbourne campus.

On January 13, 2016, Orlando City announced that they would play the entire 2016 season at Camping World Stadium. They had hoped to move into Orlando City Stadium in September but construction delays made that impossible. The team instead moved in 2017.

Roster

Competitions

Friendlies

Major League Soccer 

All times in regular season on Eastern Daylight Time (UTC−04:00) except where otherwise noted.

It was announced on December 22, 2015, that, just like the 2015 season, Orlando City would open the campaign at home, this year against Real Salt Lake. The remainder of the schedule was released on January 7, 2016.

Results summary

Results

Standings 

Eastern Conference table

Overall table

U.S. Open Cup 

On May 21, 2016, Orlando City was drawn to face the winner of the third round match between Jacksonville Armada FC, and the winner of the second round match between The Villages SC and Charleston Battery. Although The Villages SC won the match on penalty shootout, they were subsequently disqualified for fielding an ineligible player. Jacksonville Armada ultimately won the third round matchup, setting up a match in Jacksonville against Orlando City, a rematch of their preseason match.

Squad statistics

Appearances

Starting appearances are listed first, followed by substitute appearances after the + symbol where applicable.

|-
! colspan=10 style=background:#dcdcdc; text-align:center|Goalkeepers

|-
! colspan=10 style=background:#dcdcdc; text-align:center|Defenders

|-
! colspan=10 style=background:#dcdcdc; text-align:center|Midfielders

|-
! colspan=10 style=background:#dcdcdc; text-align:center|Forwards

|-
|colspan="10"|Players away from the club on loan:

|-
|colspan="10"|Players who appeared for the club but left during the season:

|}

Goalscorers

Shutouts

Player movement
Per Major League Soccer and club policies, terms of the deals do not get disclosed.

MLS SuperDraft picks 
Draft picks are not automatically signed to the team roster. The 2016 draft was held on January 14, 2016. Orlando had four selections.

Transfers In

Loan in

Transfers out

Loan out

Notable Events

On April 26, 2016, Florida Citrus Sports announced that they had sold naming rights for the stadium to Camping World. Camping World would also be the presenting sponsor of the stadium's college football kickoff series for at least its first four years, through 2019.

Adrian Heath was sacked by Orlando City on July 7, 2016, following a 4–0 defeat against FC Dallas. Bobby Murphy was the interim head coach until the hiring of former NYCFC manager Jason Kreis on July 19.

On October 2, the Lions were mathematically eliminated from the playoffs with a 1–0 loss at Montreal.

The season ended on October 23, in the final game at Camping World Stadium, with a 4–2 win against D.C. United.

Media 
Any matches that are not featured in the MLS national television package on either ESPN2, Fox Sports 1 or UniMás will air locally on WRDQ 27. Jeff Radcliffe will call play-by-play, with Lewis Neal providing color commentary. They will also air pregame and postgame shows for each match, and a weekly highlight show. They are working on affiliate agreements to air matches out-of-market.

On the radio, matches will air on WTKS-FM "Real Radio 104.1" in English, with Tom Traxler and Adam Schick providing the call. When City is on a nationally televised match, Jeff Radcliffe will call the match on WTKS with Tom Traxler. Matches will also air on WONQ "La Grande 1030" in Spanish. The Spanish play-by-play announcer is Israel Herredia, with color commentary by Sergio Ruiz. The Spanish radio feed will be used as the SAP Spanish feed on Fox Sports Florida and Sun Sports.

Orlando City will black out matches not on the MLS national television package on MLS Live this season. Local fans will be unable to watch locally televised matches via live stream during the matches, though they will become available immediately upon completion.

See also 
 2016 in American soccer
 2016 Major League Soccer season

References 

2016 Major League Soccer season
2016
American soccer clubs 2016 season
2016 in sports in Florida